The 2021–22 Iowa Hawkeyes women's basketball team represented the University of Iowa during the 2021–22 NCAA Division I women's basketball season. The Hawkeyes were led by head coach Lisa Bluder in her twenty-second season, and played their home games at Carver–Hawkeye Arena as a member of the Big Ten Conference.

Previous season
The Hawkeyes finished the 2020–21 season with a 20–10 record, including 11–8 in Big Ten play. They received an at-large bid to the 2021 NCAA Division I women's basketball tournament, where they advanced to the Sweet Sixteen.

Roster

Schedule and results

|-
!colspan=9 style=| Exhibition

|-
!colspan=9 style=| Regular Season

|-
!colspan=9 style=| Big Ten Women's Tournament

|-
!colspan=9 style="|NCAA tournament

Rankings

* Coaches did not release a week 1 poll.

References

Iowa Hawkeyes women's basketball seasons
Iowa
Iowa
Iowa
Iowa